John Richardson (born 1946 in England) is a British special effects supervisor. He is best known for his work on the James Bond film series (at least Casino Royale, Moonraker, Octopussy, A View to a Kill and Die Another Day), all the Harry Potter film series (2001-2011), A Bridge Too Far (1977) and Aliens (1986). For the latter, he won the Academy Award for Best Visual Effects at the 1987 ceremony. He won the BAFTA Award for Best Special Visual Effects for his work on the film Harry Potter and the Deathly Hallows – Part 2 (2011), for which he was also nominated for an Academy Award at the 2012 ceremony.

Filmography 
 1967: Casino Royale (special effects - uncredited)
 1968: Duffy (special effects)
 1969: Battle of Britain (special effects assistant - uncredited)
 1970: Leo the Last (special effects supervisor)
 1970: The Railway Children (special effects)
 1971: The Devils (special effects)
 1971: Straw Dogs (special effects)
 1972: Young Winston (special effects)
 1973: The Day of the Jackal (special effects: England)
 1974: Mahler (special effects) 
 1974: Callan (special effects)
 1974: Phase IV (special effects)
 1974: Juggernaut (special effects)
 1974: The Little Prince (special effects)
 1975: Rosebud (special effects)
 1975: Rollerball (special effects)
 1975: Hennessy (special effects)
 1975: Royal Flash (special effects)
 1975: Lucky Lady (special effects)
 1976: The Omen (special effects)
 1977: A Bridge Too Far (special effects supervisor)
 1977: The People That Time Forgot (special effects supervisor: Spain)
 1978: Warlords of Atlantis (special effects supervisor)
 1978: Superman (special effects: Canada and New York)
 1979: North Sea Hijack (supervisor of special effects and special sequences)
 1979: Escape to Athena (special effects)
 1979: Moonraker (special effects)
 1980: The Watcher in the Woods (special effects)
 1980: Raise the Titanic (special effects - uncredited)
 1982: Five Days One Summer (special effects supervisor)
 1983: Octopussy (special effects supervisor)
 1983: Slayground (special effects)
 1985: Ladyhawke (special effects supervisor)
 1985: A View to a Kill (special effects supervisor)
 1986: Aliens (special effects supervisor)
 1987: The Living Daylights (special visual effects)
 1988: Willow (special effects supervisor)
 1989: Licence to Kill (special visual effects)
 1990: Treasure Island (special effects supervisor)
 1991: Highlander II: The Quickening (special effects designer)
 1992: Far and Away (special effects supervisor: Ireland)
 1992: Christopher Columbus: The Discovery (special effects supervisor)
 1993: Cliffhanger (special effects coordinator)
 1993: Ghost in the Machine (special effects consultant)
 1994: Love Affair (special effects supervisor)
 1995: Bushwhacked (special effects supervisor)
 1997: Starship Troopers (special effects supervisor)
 1999: Deep Blue Sea (special effects supervisor)
 2000: The Family Man (special effects coordinator - uncredited)
 2001: Harry Potter and the Philosopher's Stone (special effects supervisor)
 2002: Men in Black II (creature coordinator) 
 2002: Enough (special effects coordinator) 
 2002: Die Another Day (model effects supervisor)
 2002: Harry Potter and the Chamber of Secrets (special effects supervisor)
 2004: Harry Potter and the Prisoner of Azkaban (special effects supervisor)
 2005: Harry Potter and the Goblet of Fire (special effects supervisor)
 2007: Harry Potter and the Order of the Phoenix (special effects supervisor)
 2009: Harry Potter and the Half-Blood Prince (special effects supervisor)
 2010: Harry Potter and the Deathly Hallows – Part 1 (special effects supervisor)
 2011: Harry Potter and the Deathly Hallows – Part 2 (special effects supervisor)

References

External links

Visual effects supervisors
Living people
Best Visual Effects Academy Award winners
Best Visual Effects BAFTA Award winners
1946 births
Special effects coordinators